"Homburg" is a song by the English rock band Procol Harum, released as the follow-up single to their initial 1967 hit "A Whiter Shade of Pale". Written by pianist Gary Brooker and lyricist Keith Reid, "Homburg" reached number 6 on the UK Singles Chart, number 15 in Canada, and number 34 in the United States. It went to number one in several countries, including the Netherlands. An Italian cover ("L'ora dell'amore" by I Camaleonti) reached number one in the Italian Hit Parade Singles Chart on December 16, 1967, and remained there for 10 weeks.

Reid's "Homburg" lyrics contains the same surreal, dream-like imagery and feelings of resignation and futility as in the debut single. The music also features Matthew Fisher's rich and deep Hammond organ, but the piano and guitar have bigger places in the overall sound. The theme is not as clearly Bach-like as in "A Whiter Shade of Pale"; nevertheless, the single was, on its release, criticised for being too similar to its predecessor.  Cash Box said  that it is "a solid, slow-paced ballad with the same haunting quality in the melody and lyrics which made 'A Whiter Shade Of Pale' such a big hit."

The title refers to the famous Homburg hat, manufactured in Bad Homburg in Germany. 
 
The B-side of the single is "Good Captain Clack", which is from the album Procol Harum.

Charts

Weekly charts

Year-end charts

References

1967 singles
Procol Harum songs
Songs with lyrics by Keith Reid
Songs written by Gary Brooker
1967 songs